The Dean of Portsmouth is the head (primus inter pares – first among equals) and chair of the chapter of canons, the ruling body of Portsmouth Cathedral. The dean and chapter are based at the Cathedral Church of Saint Thomas of Canterbury in Portsmouth. Before 2000 the post was designated as a provost, which was then the equivalent of a dean at most English cathedrals. The cathedral is the mother church of the Anglican Diocese of Portsmouth and seat of the Bishop of Portsmouth. The current Dean is the Very Revd Dr Anthony Cane.

List of deans

Provosts
1927–1930 Bernard Williams
1930–1938 Thomas Masters
1939–1972 Eric Porter Goff
1972–1982 Michael Nott
1982–1993 David Stancliffe
1994–1999 Michael Yorke
2000–2000 William Taylor (became Dean)

Deans
2000–2002 William Taylor
200210 June 2018 (ret.) David Brindley
2018–2019 Peter Leonard (Acting)
16 March 2019present Anthony Cane

References

Deans of Portsmouth
Deans of Portsmouth
 
Deans of Portsmouth
Anglican Diocese of Portsmouth